Seessel's Supermarkets was an upscale grocery chain in Memphis, Tennessee, owned by Albertsons, Inc. It was acquired by Schnucks in 2002, which rebranded the stores Schnucks.

History
Seessel's was founded in 1858, when Henry Seessel opened a meat stand in downtown Memphis. The first Seessel's Supermarket opened on Union Avenue in 1941. In 1997, brothers Art and Jerry Seessel, the fifth generation of the family to operate the business, sold the supermarket to Alabama-based Bruno's Supermarkets. Bruno's struggled with the 10-store chain, and Seessels took back the stores before selling them to Idaho-based Albertsons, Inc.  in 1999. In 2002, Albertsons sold the 12-store chain to Schnucks, which rebranded the stores.

In 2011, Schnucks left the Memphis market and sold the former Seessel's stores to Kroger.

References

Sources
Art Seessel's short biography

American companies established in 1858
Retail companies established in 1858
Companies based in Memphis, Tennessee
Retail companies disestablished in 2002
Defunct supermarkets of the United States
1858 establishments in Tennessee
2002 disestablishments in Tennessee